Ghosts is a 1915 silent film drama based on the famous 1881 play Ghosts by Henrik Ibsen. It was directed by George Nichols. D. W. Griffith produced the film and Erich von Stroheim served in several capacities as technical advisor, wardrobe assistant and costume designer. George Siegmann was an assistant director. The film had an alternate or working title The Wreck.

The play Gengangere was first performed in America in 1894.

A copy is preserved in the Library of Congress collection. And copies are also held at George Eastman Museum and UCLA Film & Television Archive

Cast
Henry B. Walthall - Captain Arling/Oswald
Mary Alden - Helen Arling
Loretta Blake - Regina

References

External links

1915 films
American silent feature films
Films directed by George Nichols
American films based on plays
Films based on works by Henrik Ibsen
American black-and-white films
Silent American drama films
1915 drama films
1910s American films